Barnacle Bill is a 1935 British drama film directed by Harry Hughes and starring Archie Pitt, Joan Gardner and Gus McNaughton. A conflicted sailor tries to balance his family life with his time at sea.

Cast
 Archie Pitt as Bill Harris
 Joan Gardner as Jill Harris
 Gus McNaughton as Jack Baron
 Jean Adrienne as Mary Bailey
 Sybil Jason as Jill as a child
 Denis O'Neil as Shorty
 O. B. Clarence as Uncle George
 Henrietta Watson as Aunt Julia
 Minnie Rayner as Mrs Bailey
 Iris Darbyshire as Florrie
 Tully Comber as Harry Fordyce

References

External links

1935 films
Films directed by Harry Hughes
British drama films
1935 drama films
British black-and-white films
1930s English-language films
1930s British films